James Andrew Courter (born October 14, 1941) is an American Republican Party politician, lawyer, and businessman. He represented parts of northwestern New Jersey in the United States House of Representatives from 1979 to 1991. In 1989, he unsuccessfully ran for Governor of New Jersey.

Early life and education
He was born October 14, 1941, in Montclair, New Jersey.

A lifelong resident of New Jersey, Courter graduated from Montclair Academy in 1959, received a Bachelor of Arts degree in 1963 from Colgate University and a Juris Doctor degree from Duke University School of Law in 1966. After law school, Courter became a Peace Corps volunteer in Venezuela.

Career
Beginning in 1971, Courter was a senior partner in the New Jersey law firm of Courter, Kobert, Laufer & Cohen. He was a partner in the Washington, D.C. law firm of Verner, Liipfert, Bernhard, McPherson and Hand from January 1994 to September 1996.

His career in public service included representing New Jersey as a member of the U.S. House of Representatives for 12 years, from 1979 until 1991. He was nominated as the Republican Party's nominee for Governor of New Jersey in 1989, but lost in a landslide defeat to Democrat Jim Florio and decided not to run for reelection to congress in 1990.

From 1991 to 1994, Courter held the position of chairman of the Base Closure and Realignment Commission, having been appointed by both President George Herbert Walker Bush and President Bill Clinton; the Commission oversaw the restructuring of the United States' domestic military base infrastructure.

After Congress
Jim Courter was chairman of the Committee for the Common Defense at the Alexis de Tocqueville Institution, which was in 1995 responsible for writing a letter in support of the Northrop Grumman B-2 Spirit bomber that seven former Secretaries of Defense (representing every Democratic and Republican Administration since Richard Nixon) signed.

He is chairman of the Lexington Institute, a think tank dedicated to resolving issues of foreign policy, national security, and international trade. He is also CEO and vice chairman of the board of directors of the IDT Corporation, based in Newark, New Jersey. Courter also serves as a member of the board of directors for the company's subsidiaries IDT Telecom, IDT Media, and IDT Winstar.

Courter currently serves as chairman of the board of advisors for the Graduate School of Management at Rutgers University, he is a member of the board of trustees for Berkeley College, and is a member of the Drew University board of visitors. Courter is on the board of trustees of the Newark Museum, is a member of the New Jersey Network Foundation board of trustees, and was named an adjunct professor at the New Jersey Institute of Technology. Courter also serves on the board of trustees of the Liberty Science Center, the board of trustees of the Newark Alliance, and is a member of the board of trustees for the New Jersey Performing Arts Center. He was awarded an honorary Doctorate of Humane Letters from Centenary College of New Jersey.

Works
 Defending Democracy, American Studies Center, June 1, 1986 
 Defense Base Closure & Realignment Commission: Report to the President, Diane Publishing Co, April 1, 1994

References

External links
 
 

1941 births
20th-century American lawyers
20th-century American politicians
American expatriates in Venezuela
Candidates in the 1989 United States elections
Colgate University alumni
Duke University School of Law alumni
Living people
Montclair Kimberley Academy alumni
New Jersey Institute of Technology faculty
New Jersey lawyers
Peace Corps volunteers
People from Essex County, New Jersey
People from Hackettstown, New Jersey
People from Montclair, New Jersey
Republican Party members of the United States House of Representatives from New Jersey